The Spensely Farm is located in Mineral Point, Wisconsin.

History
James Spensley was a British immigrant who would become a local politician. Structures on the site include Spensley's house, a spring house, a lead-smelting furnace and a barn. It was added to the State Register of Historic Places in 1996 and to the National Register of Historic Places the following year.

References

Farms on the National Register of Historic Places in Wisconsin
National Register of Historic Places in Iowa County, Wisconsin
Italianate architecture in Wisconsin